"My Tennessee Mountain Home" is a song written and recorded by American country music artist Dolly Parton.  Using imagery from her rural childhood in Tennessee (holding hands on a porch swing, enjoying nature, walking home from church), the song served as the centerpiece of her 1973 concept album My Tennessee Mountain Home. It was released as a single in December 1972, and reached number 15 on the U.S. country singles chart.

Personnel
Dolly Parton — vocals
Jimmy Capps, Jimmy Colvard, Dave Kirby, Chip Young, Bobby Thompson — guitars
Bobby Dyson — bass
Jerry Carrigan — drums
Hargus "Pig" Robbins — piano
Pete Drake — steel guitar
Don Warden — dobro
Charlie McCoy — harmonica
Johnny Gimble, Mark McGaha — fiddle
Buck Trent — banjo
Mary Hoephinger — harp
June Page, Joe Babcock, Dolores Edgin, Hurshel Wiginton — background vocals

Other versions
The song has become one of Parton's best known compositions, and was later covered by Maria Muldaur on her 1973 eponymous solo album, and by Elisabeth Andreassen on the 2005 album Short Stories. Dolly Parton herself re-recorded the song on her 1994 live album Heartsongs.

A cover version named "Ett bättre liv" (A Better Life) was recorded in Swedish by Lasse Stefanz and a children's choir.  The song appears on the 1986 album Den lilla klockan, with lyrics by the pseudonym "Mackan".

Chart performance

References

1973 singles
1973 songs
Dolly Parton songs
Songs written by Dolly Parton
RCA Records singles
Songs about Tennessee
Song recordings produced by Bob Ferguson (musician)